Andrew Justin Anglin, better known by his stage name Oyabun (stylized as OYABUN), is an American singer, rapper, songwriter, and record executive.

Early life
Anglin was born and raised in Brooklyn. He is the son of Jamaican and Vincentian immigrants who emigrated to the United States in the late 1960s.

Career

After graduating from high school, Anglin attended Borough of Manhattan Community College where he first began producing music. Anglin would freestyle frequently and make music with his childhood friend, Khamar Ali, as well as perform at open mics at BMCC and around New York. He adopted the moniker Chief Oyabun. Oyabun is a term for a Yakuza clan leader.

In early 2017 Oyabun released a four-song EP titled Retrograde. Shortly after the release of Retrograde, he released the single "Cobain", a song paying homage to the late Nirvana front man Kurt Cobain. In June 2017, the music video for "Cobain" premiered. In third quarter of 2017 OYABUN released  NVRLND, featuring production from LEMIUEX, Zavodsky, Richwell, and Oyabun himself.  He then released the monthly singles, "Life of the Party", "Trip", and "In the Night" to close out 2017. In the first quarter of 2018, Oyabun announced that he would be starting a record label, Seven Records. In mid 2018, Oyabun released the "Too Much" music video, featuring Atlanta's Kodie Shane.

As of 2016, Anglin lived in Palm Beach, Florida.

References

American rappers
African-American male rappers
Living people
21st-century American rappers
21st-century American male musicians
21st-century African-American musicians
Year of birth missing (living people)